The 2014 Men's Queensland Basketball League season was the 29th running of the competition. The Rockhampton Rockets won the championship in 2014 to claim their fifth league title.

The teams for this season were: Brisbane Capitals, Bundaberg Bulls, Cairns Marlins, Gladstone Port City Power, Gold Coast Rollers, Ipswich Force, Mackay Meteors, Northside Wizards, Rockhampton Rockets, South West Metro Pirates, Suncoast Clippers, Toowoomba Mountaineers and Townsville Heat.

Team information

Standings

Finals

*The team that finishes 1st overall goes straight through to the semi-finals.

**The top two teams from each pool face-off in the quarter-finals.

QF 1: 1st in Pool A vs. 2nd in Pool A
QF 2: 1st in Pool B vs. 2nd in Pool C
QF 3: 1st in Pool C vs. 2nd in Pool B

Awards

Player of the Week

Coach of the Month

Statistics leaders

Regular season
 Most Valuable Player: Chehales Tapscott (Rockhampton Rockets)
 Coach of the Year: Neal Tweedy (Rockhampton Rockets)
 U23 Youth Player of the Year: Mitch McCarron (Northside Wizards)
 All-League Team:
 G: James Legan (Ipswich Force)
 G: Shaun Bruce (Cairns Marlins)
 F: Chehales Tapscott (Rockhampton Rockets)
 F: Todd Blanchfield (Mackay Meteors)
 C: Ray Turner (Rockhampton Rockets)

Finals
 Grand Final Game 2 MVP: Ray Turner (Rockhampton Rockets)

Notes

References

External links
 2014 QBL Official Draw
 Quarter-finals Preview
 Quarter-finals Wrap
 Semi-finals Preview
 Semi-finals Wrap
 Grand Final Preview
 Grand Final Game 1 Wrap
 Grand Final Game 2 Wrap

2014
2013–14 in Australian basketball
2014–15 in Australian basketball